Karel Štefl (born 27 February 1982 in Slaný) is a Czech pair skater.

Career 
Between 1999 and 2001, Štefl competed with Radka Zlatohlavková and placed 21st at the 2000 Junior World Championships.

From 2001 to 2004, Štefl skated with Veronika Havlíčková. They competed at the European Championships and on the Grand Prix series, and won a bronze medal on the Junior Grand Prix series.

In the 2005–2006 season, Štefl competed with Russian skater Olga Prokuronova and won the 2006 Czech senior national title. They placed 10th in the short program at the 2006 European Championships in Lyon, France, but suffered a fall on a lift in the free skate. Prokuronova lay on the ice for several seconds before Štefl helped her to her feet and she exited the ice. They withdrew from the event. An ISU doctor said Prokuronova had not sustained a serious injury but was taken to the hospital for further examination. In October 2006, it was reported that she had declined to resume the partnership.

Programs

With Prokuronova

With Havlíčková

Results

With Prokuronova

With Havlíčková

With Zlatohlavková

References

External links 
 
 

Czech male pair skaters
1982 births
Living people
People from Slaný
Sportspeople from the Central Bohemian Region